is a former Japanese football player and manager.

Playing career
Sasaki was born in Osaka Prefecture on February 16, 1962, and grew up in Okayama Prefecture. After graduating from high school, he joined his local new club Matsushita Electric in 1980. He became a regular player and the club was promoted to Japan Soccer League in 1984. However his opportunity to play decreased from 1990. In 1992, Japan Soccer League was folded and founded new league J1 League and he moved to J1 League club Verdy Kawasaki. He could hardly play in the match. He returned to Osaka and joined Japan Football League club Cerezo Osaka. The club won the champions in 1994 and was promoted to J1 League. He retired end of 1995 season.

Coaching career
In 2003, Sasaki became a manager for L.League club Speranza FC Takatsuki. He managed the club in 1 season.

Club statistics

References

External links

1962 births
Living people
Association football people from Osaka Prefecture
Association football people from Okayama Prefecture
Japanese footballers
Japan Soccer League players
J1 League players
Japan Football League (1992–1998) players
Gamba Osaka players
Tokyo Verdy players
Cerezo Osaka players
Japanese football managers
Association football midfielders